The Jugiong Creek, a mostlyperennial river that is part of the Murrumbidgee catchment within the Murray–Darling basin, is located in the South West Slopes region of New South Wales, Australia.

Course and features 
Formed by the confluence of the Illalong and Bogolong Creeks, the Jugiong Creek (technically a river) rises in the Burrinjuck State Forest near the locality of llalong Creek, on the south western slopes of the Great Dividing Range. The creek descends  over its  course.

The creek is crossed by the Hume Highway near the river mouth.

See also 

 List of rivers of New South Wales (A-K)
 Rivers of New South Wales

References

External links

Murrumbidgee Catchment Management Authority website
 

Rivers of New South Wales
Tributaries of the Murrumbidgee River
Hume Highway
Yass Valley Council
Hilltops Council